Montgomery School may refer to the following educational establishments:

 Montgomery School at Montgomery Place, Saskatoon, Canada
 Montgomery School, Hohne, a Service Children's Education school in Germany